Rém is a village and municipality (Hungarian: község) in Bács-Kiskun county, Hungary.

Geography 

Demographics 
In the 2011 census, the municipality had a population of 1,324 individuals, with 93.4% of the population reporting to be Hungarian, 1.3% German, 1.2% Roma, and 6.4% declining to answer. The majority of the population were adherents of Roman Catholicism (68.6%), with 14.7% following no religion and 11.8% declining to answer.

References

Populated places in Bács-Kiskun County